The 1912 Wisconsin Badgers football team represented the University of Wisconsin as a member of the Western Conference during the 1912 college football season. Led first-year head coach William Juneau, the Badgers compiled an overall record of 7–0 with a mark of 5–0 in conference play, winning the Western Conference title. The team's captain was Joseph Hoeffel.

Schedule

References

Wisconsin
Wisconsin Badgers football seasons
Big Ten Conference football champion seasons
College football undefeated seasons
Wisconsin Badgers football